The 1954–55 Liga Gimel season was the last in which Liga Gimel was the third tier of Israeli football, as the new Liga Leumit became the top division, Liga Alef became the second tier, and Liga Bet became the third tier.

Hapoel Tirat HaCarmel, Hapoel Even Yehuda, Beitar Mahane Yehuda, Maccabi Shmuel Tel Aviv, Hapoel HaMegabesh Rishon LeZion and Hapoel Mefalsim won their regional divisions and promoted to Liga Bet, the new third tier, whilst Hapoel Tel Hanan, Maccabi Binyamina, Hapoel Bnei Brak\Kiryat Ono, Shimshon Tel Aviv and Maccabi Ramla were also promoted.

When the W-D-L record is not similar to the total number of matches played, the missing matches were declared 0-0 without points by the Israel Football Association.

North Division

Samaria Division

Sharon Division

Middle Division

Central Division

Negev Division

References
What the tables tell? (Page 7) Hadshot HaSport, 17.7.55, archive.football.co.il 

Liga Gimel seasons
Israel
3